This article provides details of international football games played by the Singapore national football team from 1970 to 1989.

Results

1970

1971

1972

1973

1974

1975

1976

1977

1978

1979

1980

1981

1982

1983

1984

1985

1986

1987

1988

1989 

Notes

References

Football in Singapore
Results 1970
1970s in Singaporean sport
1980s in Singaporean sport